Simon Thompson (born 16 June 1959) is a British investment banker and business executive. He is the current chairman of the Rio Tinto and was the former chairman of: Tarmac Group and Tullow Oil. He serves as the chairman of 3i.

Early life
Simon Thompson was born on 16 June 1959 in Bramhall. He was educated at the Manchester Grammar School. He graduated from University College, Oxford, where he earned a bachelor's degree in geology in 1985.

Career
Thompson worked for Lloyds Bank from 1981 to 1985, N M Rothschild & Sons from 1985 to 1994, and S. G. Warburg & Co. from 1994 to 1995. He joined Minorco, a mining company, in 1995, first as its head of finance until 1997, and as the head of its Brazilian subsidiary until 1999, when it merged with Anglo American plc. He subsequently worked for Anglo American, serving as the chief executive officer of its Anglo Base Metals Division from 2001 to 2007.

Thompson was the chairman of the Tarmac Group from 2005 to 2007. He was the chairman of Tullow Oil from 2012 to 2015, when he succeeded Adrian Montague as the chairman of 3i in 2015.

Thompson served on the boards of directors of the Newmont from 2008 to 2014. He also served on the board of Amec Foster Wheeler from 2009 to 2015, and Sandvik from 2014 2015. He serves as the chairman of Rio Tinto.

In 2020, under Thompson's chairmanship, Rio Tinto destroyed a 46,000-year-old significant Aboriginal site at Juukan Gorge in Western Australia.

Personal life
Thompson married Fiona Graham-Bryce in 1986. He is a member of the Athenæum Club and the Alpine Club, and he is the author of two books about climbing and hiking.

Works

References

Living people
1959 births
People from Bramhall
People educated at Manchester Grammar School
Alumni of University College, Oxford
English investment bankers
British corporate directors
English non-fiction writers
3i Group people